The Jailbird is a 1920 American silent comedy-drama film directed by Lloyd Ingraham and written by Julien Josephson. The film stars Douglas MacLean, Doris May, Louis Morrison, William Courtright, Wilbur Higby, and Otto Hoffman. The film was released on October 10, 1920, by Paramount Pictures.

Plot
As described in a film magazine, Shakespeare Clancy (MacLean), adroit in the art of opening safes, escapes from prison when his term still has six months to run and returns with 'Skeeter' Burns (Morrison), a friend who has just finished his sentence, to Dodson, Kansas, where Shakespeare has inherited a run-down newspaper and some worthless real estate. His first issue of the newspaper antagonizes the people of the town, and he promotes an oil stock scheme to get their money, setting up a well on his property. After he has collected money from practically all of the town residents, he prepares for his getaway only to find that Alice Whitney (May), a young woman he has come to love, owns two thousand dollars of the worthless stock. An unexpected gusher from the well on his property paves the way for a happy ending, with Shakespeare returning to prison to complete his interrupted sentence.

Cast
Douglas MacLean as Shakespeare Clancy
Doris May as Alice Whitney
Louis Morrison as 'Skeeter' Burns 
William Courtright as Noah Gibbs
Wilbur Higby as Joel Harvey
Otto Hoffman as Elkemah Pardee
Monte Collins as Asa Grider 
Bert Woodruff as Grandpa Binney
Edith Yorke as Mrs. Whitney
Joseph Hazelton as Alva Finch

Preservation status
A copy of The Jailbird is preserved in the Library of Congress collection.

References

External links

 

Silent American comedy-drama films
1920 films
1920s English-language films
1920 comedy-drama films
Paramount Pictures films
Films directed by Lloyd Ingraham
American black-and-white films
American silent feature films
1920s American films